The 2024 United States presidential election in Massachusetts is scheduled to take place on Tuesday, November 5, 2024, as part of the 2024 United States elections in which all 50 states plus the District of Columbia will participate. Massachusetts voters will choose electors to represent them in the Electoral College via a popular vote. The state of Massachusetts has 11 electoral votes in the Electoral College, following reapportionment due to the 2020 United States census in which the state neither gained nor lost a seat.

Incumbent Democratic president Joe Biden has stated that he intends to run for reelection to a second term.

Background
Since 2021, speculation had already begun brewing if President Joe Biden would seek a second term. Biden responded to this by announcing his intention to run in 2024. However, during a CBS 60 Minutes interview, Biden said that he was "not committed" to run. Massachusetts had been a Democratic leaning state since 1928, and a Democratic stronghold since 1960. Democrats have consistently defeated Republicans by large margins in Massachusetts since 1996. In 2020, Biden won the largest percent of the popular vote in the state since Lyndon B. Johnson in 1964.

Primary elections

Democratic primary

Primary polling

Republican primary 

The Massachusetts Republican primary will be held on Super Tuesday, March 5, 2024.

General election

Polling
Joe Biden vs. Donald Trump

See also 
 United States presidential elections in Massachusetts
 2024 United States presidential election
 2024 Democratic Party presidential primaries
 2024 Republican Party presidential primaries
 2024 United States elections

Notes

References 

Massachusetts
2024
Presidential